Hilarographa regalis is a species of moth of the family Tortricidae. It is found in California, United States.

The wingspan is about 20–21 mm.

References

Moths described in 1881
Hilarographini